is a Japanese manga artist best known for his series, Miami Guns. Momose is also known for adapting RahXephon into a manga.

Works 
These Japanese comics have been drawn by Takeaki Momose:
 Miami Guns
 RahXephon (loosely based on a story by Yutaka Izubuchi/BONES)
 Magikano
 Kami Sen
 Nisemono Tenshi
 Matome x Saito!

External links 
 

1970 births
Living people
Manga artists